The Argentine legislative elections of 1991 were held on four dates, 11 August, 8 September, 27 October and 1 December, though most polls took place on 8 September. Voters chose their legislators and governors and, with a turnout of 80%.

Background
Amid sudden hyperinflation and riots, Governor Carlos Menem exhorted voters in May 1989 that "following me will not disappoint you!" Elected in a landslide, his administration had a rocky start marked by an early stabilization plan that had failed by December and a series of corruption scandals surrounding his freewheeling in-laws. After a tentative stability had been achieved by the end of 1990, a new currency crisis in January 1991 led President Menem to transfer his Foreign Minister, Domingo Cavallo, to the Economics Ministry.  Cavallo, an unorthodox economist remembered for having rescinded the Central Bank's hated Circular 1050 and its crushing interest rate surcharges during a stint as Central Bank President in 1982, was entrusted to bring stability to Argentina's shredded currency, the austral, and to begin the repair of Argentina's nearly non-existent relations with its foreign creditors (owed arrears on billions of debt since 1988) and the country's own sizable upper class (who held well over US$50 billion in assets abroad).

Backed partly by a then-record US$8 billion trade surplus in 1990 and partly by the assumption that Menem's free-market policies would encourage a wave of foreign direct investment, Cavallo's Convertibility Plan tied the Argentine currency to the U.S. dollar, leading a sharp drop in local interest rates and to a recovery in local deposits, lending and the depressed economy soon after the plan's March 27, 1991, introduction. Currency stability led particularly to lower inflation, which fell from 1,350% in 1990 to 84% in 1991; prices rose 1.3% in the month of August (the best showing since 1974) and the hitherto unpopular Menem saw his approval soar. Menem's turn against time-honored Justicialist Party tenets such as the support of labor laws and the encouragement of State enterprises (policies defined in the 1940s by the party's very founder, Juan Perón), led some in his party to run on splinter Peronist tickets, which did well - but came far from seriously challenging the official party ticket.

Menem's contentious divorce from his wife of 25 years, Zulema Yoma, reports of massive corruption surrounding his in-laws and the resignation under indictment of his Public Works Minister and privatizations guru, Roberto Dromi, could not overshadow the improving economic climate among the electorate at large. The Justicialist Party's victory in the 1991 mid-term elections was not so much absolute as it was relative: the party made no inroads into their large majorities in the Argentine Chamber of Deputies or among the nation's governors; indeed, they lost 3 of their 17 governors elected in 1987. They did, however, increase their difference over the UCR, whose leader, former President Raúl Alfonsín, resigned amid scorn over the shadow his chaotic 1983-89 tenure seemed to cast over these polls. The UCR, in two upsets, wrested governorships in Catamarca and Chubut Provinces, however. These elections helped consolidate the scandal-plagued Menem's tenuous grasp on the presidency, making them (in his words) "the day Menemism was born."

Results

References

1991
1991 elections in Argentina
Presidency of Carlos Menem